Slovenia participated in the Eurovision Song Contest 2010 with the song "Narodnozabavni rock" written by Marino Legovič and Leon Oblak. The song was performed by Ansambel Žlindra and Kalamari. Slovenian broadcaster Radiotelevizija Slovenija (RTV Slovenija) organised the national final EMA 2010 in order to select the Slovenian entry for the 2010 contest in Oslo, Norway. The national final consisted of a semi-final and a final where "Narodnozabavni rock" performed by Ansambel Žlindra and Kalamari was eventually selected as the winner entirely by a public vote.

Slovenia was drawn to compete in the second semi-final of the Eurovision Song Contest which took place on 27 May 2010. Performing during the show in position 11, "Narodnozabavni rock" was not announced among the top 10 entries of the second semi-final and therefore did not qualify to compete in the final. It was later revealed that Slovenia placed sixteenth out of the 17 participating countries in the semi-final with 6 points.

Background 

Slovenia's highest placing in the contest, to this point, has been seventh place, which the nation achieved on two occasions: in 1995 with the song "Prisluhni mi" performed by Darja Švajger and in 2001 with the song "Energy" performed by Nuša Derenda. The country's only other top ten result was achieved in 1997 when Tanja Ribič performing "Zbudi se" placed tenth. Since the introduction of semi-finals to the format of the contest in 2004, Slovenia had thus far only managed to qualify to the final on one occasion. In 2009, "Love Symphony" performed by Quartissimo feat. Martina failed to qualify to the final.

The Slovenian national broadcaster, Radiotelevizija Slovenija (RTV Slovenija), broadcasts the event within Slovenia and organises the selection process for the nation's entry. RTV Slovenija confirmed Slovenia's participation in the 2010 Eurovision Song Contest on 18 October 2009. The Slovenian entry for the Eurovision Song Contest has traditionally been selected through a national final entitled Evrovizijska Melodija (EMA), which has been produced with variable formats. For 2010, the broadcaster opted to organise EMA 2010 to select the Slovenian entry.

Before Eurovision

EMA 2010 

EMA 2010 was the 15th edition of the Slovenian national final format Evrovizijska Melodija (EMA). The competition was used by RTV Slovenija to select Slovenia's entry for the Eurovision Song Contest 2010. The 2010 edition of EMA took place at the Gospodarsko razstavišče in Ljubljana and consisted of two shows: a semi-final and a final. The competition was broadcast on TV SLO1 and online via the broadcaster's website rtvslo.si.

Format 
A total of twenty-one songs competed in two televised shows consisting of a semi-final on 20 February 2010 and a final on 21 February 2010. Fourteen of the songs were selected from open submissions and competed in the semi-final with public televoting exclusively selecting seven finalists out of the fourteen songs to proceed to the final. In the final, the seven qualifying songs in the semi-final alongside an additional seven pre-qualified songs written by composers directly invited by RTV Slovenija for the competition competed and public televoting exclusively determined the winner.

Competing entries 
Artists and composers were able to submit their entries to the broadcaster between 17 October 2009 and 14 December 2009. For the 2010 edition, all songs were required to be performed in Slovene due to certain legal restrictions made on RTV Slovenija to promote the Slovene language. 111 entries were received by the broadcaster during the submission period. An expert committee consisting of Mojca Menart (Head of the publishing business of ZKP RTV SLO), Urška Čop (music editor for Radio Maribor), Andrea Flego (radio host, musician and producer), Miha Vardjan (musician and producer) and Drago Mislej Mef (guitarist, musician and songwriter) selected fourteen artists and songs for the semi-final of the competition from the received submissions, while the seven pre-qualifying songs for the final of the competition were written by composers directly invited by RTV Slovenija based on their success on EMA in recent years and their performance in the Slovenian charts: Gal Gjurin, Marino Legovič, Miran Juvan, Neisha, Patrik Greblo, Raay and Zvone Tomac. The composers also selected the performer for their entry. The competing artists in the semi-final and final were announced on 18 December 2009 and 8 January 2010, respectively. Among the competing artists was former Slovenian Eurovision contestant Nuša Derenda who represented Slovenia in 2001.

Semi-final
The semi-final of EMA 2010 took place on 20 February 2010, hosted by Ivo Kores and Bernarda Žarn. In addition to the performances of the competing entries, 2008 Slovenian Eurovision entrant Rebeka Dremelj, 2009 Bosnian Eurovision entrants Regina, Natalija Verboten and Eva Černe performed as guests. A public vote selected seven entries to proceed to the final.

Final
The final of EMA 2010 took place on 21 February 2010, hosted by Lorella Flego and Andrea F. The seven entries that qualified from the semi-final alongside the seven pre-qualified entries competed. In addition to the performances of the competing entries, 2005 Slovenian Eurovision entrant Omar Naber, 2009 Eurovision winner Alexander Rybak, Saša Lendero and Tinkara Kovač performed as guests. A public vote selected "Narodnozabavni rock" performed by Ansambel Roka Žlindre and Kalamari as the winner.

At Eurovision 

According to Eurovision rules, all nations with the exceptions of the host country and the "Big Four" (France, Germany, Spain and the United Kingdom) are required to qualify from one of two semi-finals in order to compete for the final; the top ten countries from each semi-final progress to the final. The European Broadcasting Union (EBU) split up the competing countries into six different pots based on voting patterns from previous contests, with countries with favourable voting histories put into the same pot. On 7 February 2010, a special allocation draw was held which placed each country into one of the two semi-finals. Slovenia was placed into the second semi-final, to be held on 27 May 2010. The running order for the semi-finals was decided through another draw on 23 March 2010 and Slovenia was set to perform in position 11, following the entry from Romania and before the entry from Ireland.

In Slovenia, the semi-finals and the final were televised on RTV Slovenija with commentary by Andrej Hofer. The Slovenian spokesperson, who announced the Slovenian votes during the final, was Andrea F.

Semi-final 

Ansambel Žlindra and Kalamari took in technical rehearsals on 19 and 22 May, followed by dress rehearsals on 26 and 27 May. This included the jury show on 26 May where the professional juries of each country watched and voted on the competing entries.

The Slovenian performance featured the members of Ansambel Žlindra performing in casual clothes, jeans and t-shirts and the members of Kalamari performing in black, white and red traditional folk dresses. The performance also featured interactions between the two lead vocalists of both bands who both hid behind the other members at the beginning and jumping out as the music began. The stage backdrop was dark and the lights varied from white to shades of red as the song progressed.

At the end of the show, Slovenia was not announced among the top 10 entries in the second semi-final and therefore failed to qualify to compete in the final. It was later revealed that Slovenia placed sixteenth in the semi-final, receiving a total of 6 points.

Voting 
Voting during the three shows involved each country awarding points from 1-8, 10 and 12 as determined by a combination of 50% national jury and 50% televoting. Each nation's jury consisted of five music industry professionals who are citizens of the country they represent. This jury judged each entry based on: vocal capacity; the stage performance; the song's composition and originality; and the overall impression by the act. In addition, no member of a national jury was permitted to be related in any way to any of the competing acts in such a way that they cannot vote impartially and independently. The members that comprised the Slovenian jury were: Urša Vlašič (lyricist, writer of the 1998, 2005 and 2006 Slovene contest entries), Sandra Feketija (singer), Miroslav Akrapovič (music editor and critic), Matjaž Bogataj (violinist, represented Slovenia in the 2009 contest as part of the group Quartissimo) and Dušan Hren (director).

Below is a breakdown of points awarded to Slovenia and awarded by Slovenia in the second semi-final and grand final of the contest. The nation awarded its 12 points to Croatia in the semi-final and to Denmark in the final of the contest.

Points awarded to Slovenia

Points awarded by Slovenia

References

External links
  Official EMA site
  Rules for EMA 2010

2010
Countries in the Eurovision Song Contest 2010
Eurovision